Jamali Zayer Hoseyn (also Romanized as Jamālī Zāyer Ḩoseyn; also known as Jamālī Zā’er Ḩasan, Jamālī Zāyer Ḩoseynī, Zā’er Hasan Jamālī, and Zā’er Ḩoseyn-e Jamālī) is a village in Ahram Rural District, in the Central District of Tangestan County, Bushehr Province, Iran. 299 people, in 79 families, were living there as of the 2006 Census.

References 

Populated places in Tangestan County